The Vulture, also known as the Vulture-Melfese or Vulture-Alto Bradano is a geographical and historical region in the northern part of the province of Potenza, in the Basilicata region of Italy.

Geography
The area consists of the comuni of Atella, Barile, Ginestra, Melfi, Rapolla, Ripacandida, Rionero in Vulture, Maschito, Venosa, Ruvo del Monte, Rapone, and San Fele. The area takes its name from the extinct volcano Monte Vulture (1326 m). Sights include the two lakes of Monticchio within the crater of the volcano, and the castles of Frederick II of Hohenstaufen at Castel Lagopesole and Melfi.

Produce
The fertile volcanic soil of the Vulture is suitable for the cultivation of grapes and olives. The DOC wine Aglianico del Vulture is produced in the region, as are Aglianico dolce, a dessert wine, Aglianico di Filiano, Malvasia del Vulture and Moscato del Vulture. The area of Monte Vulture has numerous springs, and several brands of mineral water are bottled there.

See also
Aglianico del Vulture
Monte Vulture
Monticchio

References

External links

 Portal for the Vulture area

 
Geography of Basilicata
Province of Potenza
Geographical, historical and cultural regions of Italy